Tricky Dicky was a British comic strip which originally ran in the British comics magazine  Cor!!.  It debuted in 1970, drawn by Cyril Gwyn Price (1905-1970). It ran until September 29, 1973. After Price's death other comic strip artists continued the series.

Concept
Similar to Roger the Dodger in The Beano, the strip was about a boy of the same name (Dicky), who would 'trick' his way out of things like washing the car or carrying heavy cases. Unlike Roger, however, his schemes would usually backfire on him. Dicky was a blond boy with a large quiff, who was a teenage boy during his first appearances, but gradually was remodelled into a younger boy as the series went on.

Similarities with other comics

There is another British comic strip called Tricky Dicky. It also features a young British boy who enjoys playing tricks on others that backfire on him, but it is a completely different character. This particular boy has black spiky hair.

Sources

British comic strips
British humour comics
British comics characters
1970 comics debuts
Comics characters introduced in 1970
1973 comics endings
Child characters in comics
Gag-a-day comics
Fictional tricksters